Group army may refer to
 in Chinese contexts, either:
 a army-level formation, such as the present-day army groups of China
 a field army such as: army groups of the National Revolutionary Army during World War II
 in other contexts an army group, comprising several field armies